Shul-e Sarui (also Romanized as Shūl-e Sārū’ī; also known as Shūl) is a village in Naqsh-e Rostam Rural District, in the Central District of Marvdasht County, Fars Province, Iran. At the 2006 census, its population was 1,396, in 320 families.

References 

Populated places in Marvdasht County